The 2020 United States Census reported that San Francisco had a population of 815,201—an increase from the 2010 Census count of 805,235. With a population density of 18,633 per square mile (7,194/km2), San Francisco is the second-most densely populated major American city, behind only New York (among cities greater than 200,000 population).

San Francisco is the traditional focal point of the San Francisco Bay Area and forms part of the five-county San Francisco–Oakland–Hayward, CA Metropolitan Statistical Area, a region of 4.6 million people.  It is also part of the greater 12-county San Jose-San Francisco-Oakland, CA Combined Statistical Area, whose population is over 8.75 million, making it the fifth-largest in the United States as of July 1, 2016.

Race and ethnicity

As of the 2020 census, the racial makeup and population of San Francisco included: Whites (44.9%), Asians (34.3%), African Americans (5.1%), Native Americans (0.4%), Native Hawaiians and Pacific Islanders (0.4%) two or more races (7.2%). The ethnic makeup of San Francisco is 15.2% Hispanics or Latinos of any race (15.2%), 84.98% Non-Hispanic.

According to the 2020 census, San Francisco has a minority-majority population, as non-Hispanic European Americans comprise less than half of the population at 39.8%, down from 92.5% in 1940. The principal Hispanic groups in the city were those of Mexican, Salvadoran, Nicaraguan, Guatemalan, and Puerto Rican ancestry. The Hispanic population is most heavily concentrated in the Mission District, Tenderloin District, and Excelsior District.
San Francisco's African American population has declined in recent decades, from 13.4% of the population in 1970 to 6.1% in 2010. The current percentage of African Americans in San Francisco is similar to that of the state of California; conversely, the city's percentage of Hispanic residents is less than half of that of the state. The majority of the city's black population reside within the neighborhoods of Bayview-Hunters Point, and Visitacion Valley in southeastern San Francisco, and in the Fillmore District in the northeastern part of the city.

In 2010, residents of Chinese ethnicity constituted the largest single ethnic minority group in San Francisco at 21.4% of the population; the other Asian groups are Filipinos (4.5%), Vietnamese (1.6%), Japanese (1.3%), Asian Indians (1.2%), Koreans (1.2%), Thais (0.3%), Burmese (0.2%), Cambodians (0.2%), and Indonesians, Laotians, and Mongolians make up less than 0.1% of the city's population. The population of Chinese ancestry is most heavily concentrated in Chinatown, Sunset District, and Richmond District, whereas Filipinos are most concentrated in the Crocker-Amazon (which is contiguous with the Filipino community of Daly City, which has one of the highest concentrations of Filipinos in North America), as well as in SoMa.

After declining in the 1970s and 1980s, the Filipino community in the city has experienced a significant resurgence. The San Francisco Bay Area is home to over 382,950 Filipino Americans, one of the largest communities of Filipinos outside of the Philippines. The Tenderloin District is home to a large portion of the city's Vietnamese population as well as businesses and restaurants, which is known as the city's Little Saigon. Koreans and Japanese have a large presence in the Western Addition, which is where the city's Japantown is located. The Pacific Islander population is 0.4% (0.8% including those with partial ancestry). Over half of the Pacific Islander population is of Samoan descent, with residence in the Bayview-Hunters Point and Visitacion Valley areas; Pacific Islanders make up more than three percent of the population in both communities.

Native-born Californians form a relatively small percentage of the city's population: only 37.7% of its residents were born in California, while 25.2% were born in a different U.S. state. More than a third of San Francisco residents (34.2%) were born outside the United States.

Historical estimates

2019 United States Census Bureau American Community Survey estimates

According to 2019 American Community Survey annual estimates conducted by the US Census Bureau, San Francisco's population was 45.2% European American (39.8% Non-Hispanic White and 5.4% Hispanic White), 5.5% Black or African American, 34.9% Asian, 7.9% Some Other Race, 0.4% Native American and Alaskan Native, 0.4% Pacific Islander and 5.7% from two or more races.

The White population continues to remain the largest racial category in San Francisco and includes the 35.5% of Hispanics who self-identify as White. The remainder of Hispanics self-identify as Other Race (49.1%), Multiracial (10.7%), American Indian and Alaskan Native (0.8%), Black (1.6%), Asian (2.2%), and Hawaiian and Pacific Islander (0.2%).

Asian Americans remain the largest minority group at either 34.9% (including Asian Hispanics) or 34.6% (excluding Asian Hispanics).

The Black population continues to decline and at 5.5% (including Black Hispanics) or 5.2% (excluding Black Hispanics) is well below the national average of 12.8% (including Black Hispanics). The Black population peaked in the 1970 Census at 13.4%.

If Hispanics are treated as a separate category from race, San Francisco's population was 39.8% European, 34.6% Asian, 15.2% Hispanic-Latino, 5.2% Black or African American, 0.4% Some Other Race, 0.3% Native American and Alaskan Native, 0.4% Pacific Islander and 4.1% from two or more races. By ethnicity, 15.2% of the total population is Hispanic-Latino (of any race), below the national average of 18.4%. If treated as a category separate from race, Hispanics are the third largest minority group in San Francisco County.

The largest ancestry group of Hispanics in San Francisco are of Mexican descent (52.7% of Hispanics) followed by Salvadoran descent (12.0% of Hispanics), Nicaraguan descent (8.0%), Guatemalan descent (5.3%), Puerto Rican descent (3.7%), Spaniard descent (2.9%), Peruvian descent (2.8%), Chilean descent (1.4%), Colombian descent (1.4%), Cuban descent (1.3%), Argentinian descent (1.1%), and those of other Hispanic ethnicity or of mixed Hispanic ethnicity (7.4%).

European Americans
As of July 2019, European Americans in San Francisco are 45.2% of the population of San Francisco. Non-Hispanic whites are 39.8% of the population.

History
White people of European descent, first the Spanish, gradually displaced the native people of the area that would eventually become San Francisco.

Neighborhoods
The neighborhoods that have the highest percentage of non-Hispanic white residents are Marina (78.2%), Cow Hollow (76.8%), Parnassus - Ashbury (74.1%), Eureka Valley - Dolores Heights - Castro (73.8%), and Noe Valley (72.0%).

The neighborhoods with the lowest percentage of non-Hispanic white residents are Visitacion Valley (5.5%) and Silver Terrace (7.0%).

Education
White students make up only 12.9% of San Francisco public school students, despite white people constituting 41.6% of the city's population. Although this discrepancy is explained somewhat by white residents being older on average than residents of other ethnic groups, the more important reason is that white students are disproportionately likely to be enrolled in private school. This is increasingly the case in higher levels of education, with only 8.9% of the public high school population being white.

African Americans

Those who identify solely as African American made up 5.2% of the population in 2019. Those who include partial non-black ancestry make up 6.4% of the city's population. Neighborhoods with significant black populations include Fillmore District, Hunters Point, and Visitacion Valley.

Asian Americans

San Francisco is about 35% Asian, with 23% being Chinese. Chinatown, Richmond District and Sunset District have significant Chinese populations. Japanese communities are found in Japantown and Sunset District. Vietnamese community is concentrated in Chinatown, Tenderloin, Richmond, and Sunset. The Filipino community is concentrated in Crocker Amazon and Soma.

Hispanic and Latino Americans

Education, households, and income
Of all major cities in the United States, San Francisco has the second-highest percentage of residents with a college degree, behind only Seattle. Over 44% of adults within the city limits have a bachelor's or higher degree. USA Today reported that Rob Pitingolo, a researcher who measured college graduates per square mile, found that San Francisco had the highest rate at 7,031 per square mile, or over 344,000 total graduates in the city's .

The Census reported that 780,971 people (97.0% of the population) lived in households, 18,902 (2.3%) lived in non-institutionalized group quarters, and 5,362 (0.7%) were institutionalized. There were 345,811 households, out of which 63,577 (18.4%) had children under the age of 18 living in them, 109,437 (31.6%) were opposite-sex married couples living together, 28,844 (8.3%) had a female householder with no spouse present, 12,748 (3.7%) had a male householder with no spouse present. There were 21,677 (6.3%) unmarried opposite-sex partnerships, and 10,384 (3.0%) same-sex married couples or partnerships. 133,366 households (38.6%) were made up of individuals, and 34,234 (9.9%) had someone living alone who was 65 years of age or older. The average household size was 2.26. There were 151,029 families (43.7% of all households); the average family size was 3.11.  There were 376,942 housing units, at an average density of 1,625.5 per square mile (627.6/km2), of which 123,646 (35.8%) were owner-occupied, and 222,165 (64.2%) were occupied by renters. The homeowner vacancy rate was 2.3%; the rental vacancy rate was 5.4%. 327,985 people (40.7% of the population) lived in owner-occupied housing units and 452,986 people (56.3%) lived in rental housing units.

According to the 2005 American Community Survey, San Francisco has the highest percentage of gay and lesbian individuals of any of the 50 largest U.S. cities, at 15.4%. San Francisco also has the highest percentage of same-sex households of any American county, with the Bay Area having a higher concentration than any other metropolitan area.

San Francisco ranks third of American cities in median household income with a 2007 value of $65,519. Median family income is $81,136, and the San Francisco Bay Area ranks 8th in the number of billionaires known in the region. Following a national trend, an emigration of middle-class families is contributing to widening income disparity and has left the city with a lower proportion of children, 14.5%, than any other large American city.

The city's poverty rate is 11.8% and the number of families in poverty stands at 7.4%, both lower than the national average. The unemployment rate stands at 4.8% in the greater San Francisco Bay Area .

Homelessness

Homelessness has been a chronic and controversial problem for San Francisco since the early 1970s when many mentally ill patients were deinstitutionalized, due to changes which began during the 1960s with the enactment of Medicare and Medicaid. The homeless population is estimated to be 13,500 with 6,500 living on the streets. The city is believed to have the highest number of homeless inhabitants per capita of any major U.S. city. Rates of reported violent and property crimes for 2009 (736 and 4,262 incidents per 100,000 residents, respectively) are slightly lower than for similarly sized U.S. cities.

Languages and ages
As of 2020, 54.58% (411,728) of San Francisco residents aged five and older spoke only English at home, while 18.60% (140,302) spoke a Chinese language, 11.68% (88,147) Spanish, 3.42% (25,767) Tagalog, 1.86% (14,017) Russian, 1.45% (10,939) Vietnamese, 1.05% (7,895) French, 0.90% (6,777) Japanese, 0.88% (6,624) Korean, 0.56% (4,215) German, 0.53% (3,995) Italian, and Pacific Islander languages were spoken by 0.47% (3,535). In total, 45.42% (342,693) of San Francisco's population aged five and older spoke a language at home other than English.

The age distribution of the city was as follows: 107,524 people (13.4%) under the age of 18, 77,664 people (9.6%) aged 18 to 24, 301,802 people (37.5%) aged 25 to 44, 208,403 people (25.9%) aged 45 to 64, and 109,842 people (13.6%) who were 65 years of age or older. The median age was 38.5 years. For every 100 females, there were 102.9 males. For every 100 females age 18 and over, there were 102.8 males.

Religion

According to a Pew Research study conducted in 2014, the religious demographics of San Francisco are as follows:
Christianity 48%
Catholicism 25%
Protestantism 20%
Evangelical Protestantism 10%
Mainline Protestantism 6%
Historically Black Protestant 4%
Mormonism 1%
Eastern Orthodoxy 1%
 Other Christian 1%
Irreligion 35%
Others 15%
Hinduism 5%
Judaism 3%
Buddhism 2%
Islam 1%
Other religion 4%
Don't know 2%

Notes

References

 
San Francisco